Akanbi Bamidele Brett (born March 23, 1995), known by his stage name CHEQUE, is a Nigerian singer, songwriter and a rapper.
Cheque is popularly known across Nigeria for his hit song ‘Zoom’ which was released in 2020. In 2021, he won an award for Best Duo African HipHop at the All Africa Music Awards alongside Fireboy DML. He is currently signed to Phyno's Penthauze imprint.

Early life 
Cheque is from Okitipupa  in Ondo State where he was born, but he grew up in Ondo Town, Ondo State. He attended Obafemi Awolowo University in Osun State where he studied Chemical Engineering and graduated in 2016.

Career 

The music and entertainment industry is normalized to breathe in fresh talent every second as the door is left always open, Cheque utilized the gap by breaking in. While he was still an undergraduate at the University, he discovered his talent in music and invested in it. Cheque started off as a musician using the stage name Kyle B. His genre of music was particularly Gospel hip hop back then. 

Cheque attended the same school with the likes of Blaqbonez and others. During his music days as Kyle B, he’s worked on Hennessy Cypher (Part VI) featuring the likes of Dark Poet, Kursor, Blaqbonez, Toosleek, and Eclipse.

While garnering popularity on campus as Kyle B released an EP project which was Super Adventure Crew.

February 2019, he was discovered by Phyno who immediately gave him a recording deal with Penthauze Music.

With no hesitation, the following month which was March, his month of birth, an introductory song, Nyem Space was released for Cheque which was a collaboration with one of the acts in the record label.
Cheque whose music style is an infusion of afrobeat into rap, trap, RnB, and other genres makes him stand out among his peer. During June while still very much marked under Penthauze Music, he dropped Jekasoro (a Yoruba word meaning Let’s talk), Pain Away, and Abundance.

The rave of the moment act became popular after being announced as a new act by Phyno via his social media platforms.

As Kyle B, also known as Cheque released his five track EP, S.O.O.N EP in 2015. It featured DML (Now Fireboy DML), Chinko Ekun and Zamora.
In January 2019, he was officially signed into Phyno's Penthauze and he was on the collective track "Nyem Space", which also had Rhatti and Nuno, who Phyno also just signed at the time.
In February 2020, he was featured on the track ‘Warlord’ in Olamide's 999 EP.
In July 2020, he released his first EP in Penthauze music titiled ‘Razor’ which had the hit track ‘Zoom’. He also did a remix of ‘Zoom’ with Davido and Wale afterwards. In September 2021, Cheque featured Olamide in a single titled LOML (Love Of My Life) and later released his debut studio album ‘Bravo’ on 24 September 2021.

Discography

Albums/EPs 
 S.O.O.N EP (2015)
 RAZOR EP (2020)
 Bravo (2021)

Selected singles 
 Wave (2018)
 Energy (2019)
 Jekasoro (2019)
 Pain away (2019)
 Abundance (2019)
 Zoom (2020)
 LOML (2021)

See also 
Olamide
Phyno
Fireboy DML
999 (EP)

References 

1995 births
Living people
21st-century Nigerian male singers
Obafemi Awolowo University alumni